Ktsia-Tabatskuri Managed Reserve is a protected area in Akhalkalaki Municipality in Samtskhe-Javakheti region of Georgia. It protects Tabatskuri Lake, wetland and alpine habitats.

The  Tskhratskaro pass is located within the Ktsia-Tabatskuri Managed Reserve.

Environmental Concerns
The Baku–Tbilisi–Ceyhan pipeline is partly situated within the borders of Ktsia-Tabatskuri Managed Reserve.

See also
Tetrobi Managed Reserve

References 

Managed reserves of Georgia (country)
Protected areas established in 1995
Geography of Samtskhe–Javakheti
Tourist attractions in Samtskhe–Javakheti